Air Buddies is a 2006 American sports comedy film directed by Robert Vince. It is the sixth film in the Air Bud series and the first in the direct-to-video spin-off series Air Buddies, which follows the life of a lonely teenager and his dog who has the uncanny ability to play every sport.

The film changes the primary focus of the series from Buddy, an adult golden retriever, to his puppies. It also radically alters the character of the series by making virtually all of the animals speak.

Air Buddies was released on December 12, 2006. It is the final film of both Don Knotts and Patrick Cranshaw, released after their deaths.

Plot
Sniffer (voiced by Don Knotts) introduces the five Air Buddies, describes their personalities and recaps how the puppies' father, Air Bud, made the town of Fernfield famous through his love of sports. When their families leave home for a basketball game, the puppies get into trouble with their sitter, Mrs. Niggles, by playing with balls of yarn and eating a blueberry pie. This prompts their owners to finally put the puppies up for adoption.

Meanwhile, Selkirk Tander (Holmes Osborne) tries to impress Mr. Livingston's  (Steve Makaj) son, Bartleby Livingston by showing him a female tiger for his birthday, but Bartleby wanted an animal he can play with. He wants Air Bud (Buddy) because Buddy can play sports. Mr. Livingston offers $500,000 if Selkirk can get Buddy. Selkirk then sends his nephew Grim and assistant Denning to capture Buddy.

At school, Noah and Henry collect every boy and girl's profile sheets and photos. After deciding which children would make good owners, the family decides to call them the next day. Grim and Denning arrive at Buddy's home, only to see Buddy and Molly at the same time, thinking there are two air buds or they are mates. The next morning, the pups decide to run away. Grim and Denning follow them, and manage to catch Budderball by luring him with a doughnut. When the other Buddies go and find Budderball, they are also captured and used as bait to catch Buddy and Molly. Buddy manages to free the Buddies but Denning traps him with a net. Molly attempts to save Buddy but gets herself captured. Denning and Grim put Buddy and Molly in the truck, while the buddies chase after them.

In wine country, Selkirk is pleased that Denning and Grim captured both Buddy and Molly so he can have them breed puppies and sell them for money. When Grim explains that Buddy and Molly already had puppies, which Denning let get away, Selkirk tells them to lock the dogs in the wine cellar and go and capture them. Selkirk also replaces Grim as the leader of the mission to capture the Buddies. Grim and Denning go back to Buddy's home to capture the Buddies but with no luck. The Buddies have sniffed their way to a drive-in movie theater, where Grim and Denning are watching 101 Dalmatians. The Buddies find their way to the projection room and walk in front of the projector, their shadows attracting Denning and Grim's attention. However, the two are confronted by bikers who correctly believe their intentions of harming the Buddies, resulting in them being ambushed and tied up to the screen, after which the crowd hurls popcorn and other food items at them.

The next morning, Grim and Denning escape the theater and catch up to the Buddies, chasing them to a farm. The Buddies meet Billy the goat and Belinda the pig, who help the Buddies escape from Grim and Denning. The Buddies lure Grim and Denning into a stable and escape through a small hole as Billy locks Grim and Denning in. The Buddies go through the forest then meet the Wolf who leads them to wine country. A skunk's spray enables Sniffer to smell again, so he calls Noah and Henry, and they go off to find the Buddies. Buddy and Molly manage to escape to find the Buddies. Budderball falls into a hole, which Buddy and Molly dug, forcing the Buddies to help. Noah and Henry are led by Sniffer through the same farm that the Buddies went through. Noah and Henry are ecstatic and overjoyed at finding Grim and Denning being held prisoners by Billy the goat, and immediately leave to report them and turn them in to authorities over Grim and Denning's protests. Bartleby and his father come to collect the dogs but instead find the Buddies. Bartleby and his father then put the Buddies in a limousine, just as Noah, Henry, Buddy and Molly come to rescue the Buddies. Budderball falls into one of the wine containers and gets drunk. Bartleby catches Budderball but is seen by Sniffer.

Noah, Henry, and the dogs release barrels towards Selkirk and Mr. Livingston; the barrels slam into the wine containers and break them. Selkirk and Mr. Livingston fall in, as the container cracks open. Sheriff Bob arrives to arrest Selkirk, Denning, and Grim. The Buddies apologize to Buddy and Molly; and say they're ready for their new owners. Budderball decides to stay with Bartleby because he needs a friend. The puppies are introduced to their new families and end up enjoying their new lives. The film ends with Buddy, Molly, Buddha, Budderball, Rosebud, B-Dawg, Mudbud, Sniffer and The Wolf howling to show how they are still family, despite their distance.

Cast

Live-action cast
 Slade Pearce as Noah Sullivan, the son of Jackie and Patrick.
 Holmes Osborne as Selkirk Tander, the villain of the movie.
 Trevor Wright as Grim, Selkirk's foolish nephew. 
 Paul Rae as Denning
 Christian Pikes as Henry
 Patrick Cranshaw as Sheriff Bob
 Tyler Guerrero as Bartleby Livingston
 Steven Makaj as Mr. Miles Livingston
 Richard Karn as Dr. Patrick Sullivan, a local veterinarian, the father of Noah and the husband of Jackie-
 Cynthia Stevenson as Jackie Framm Sullivan, the mother of Josh and the wife of Patrick.
 Jane Carr as Mrs. Niggles
 Scout and Parker as Air Bud (because of the demanding schedule, the role was played by more than one dog)

Voice cast (alphabetical order)
 Abigail Breslin as Rosebud, the lone girl, only sister, and youngest of the Buddies. She always wears a pink bow in her fur (usually her head) to separate herself from her brothers. She is  protective of her brothers and her favorite color is pink.
 Dominic Scott Kay as Buddha, the peaceful Buddhist of the Buddies. He loves to meditate and wears a Buddhist collar made of beads. He is named after a virtuous person, Gautama Buddha.
 Josh Flitter as Budderball, the chubbiest, biggest, and oldest of the Buddies. He enjoys food and wears eye black on his face to look like a football player. In addition to this he also sports a red football shirt. When his paw is pulled, he farts, an allusion to Pull my finger.
 Spencer Fox as Mudbud, the dirt-loving dude of the Buddies. He wears a blue handkerchief around his neck.
 Skyler Gisondo as B-Dawg, the rapping pup of the Buddies. He loves hip hop and wears a platinum chain with a 'B' as a pendant around his neck to look cool. 
 Tom Everett Scott as Buddy, the father of the Buddies. He's still as fun-loving and athletic as he was before the Buddies were born. He belongs to Noah. After the events of the previous "Air Bud" movies his former owners Josh and Andrea have grown up and moved out. This is the first time Buddy actually speaks.
 Molly Shannon as Molly, the mother of the Buddies. She loves her children and Buddy very much and will do anything to protect them. She belongs to Henry.
 Michael Clarke Duncan as the Wolf, a friendly inhabitant of the forest who helps the Buddies get to wine country.
 Don Knotts as Sniffer, an old Bloodhound who lost his sense of smell years ago. He later regains it after getting sprayed by a skunk. He is one of the characters in the movie who help the Buddies find their parents.
 Wallace Shawn as Billy, a goat who the Buddies meet on the farm. He helps keep the Buddies out of Grim and Denning's clutches.
 Debra Jo Rupp as Belinda, a kind sow who the Buddies meet on the farm and speaks Pig Latin.

B-Dawg is the pup who can play basketball, while Budderball plays football, Rosebud plays soccer, Buddha plays baseball, and Mudbud plays volleyball.
All the animals can speak in this film. This was the first time speaking animals have appeared in the Air Bud series.

Release
The movie was released directly to DVD on December 12, 2006 by Buena Vista Home Entertainment, the same day as The Fox and the Hound 2.

Mill Creek Entertainment reissued the movie on January 14, 2020 on a 2-disc boxset with the other films in the series.

References

External links
 The Official Disney Air Buddies Website
 
 
 Air Buddies DVD Review

2006 films
2006 direct-to-video films
2000s sports comedy films
2006 comedy films
American sports comedy films
American sequel films
American direct-to-video films
Disney direct-to-video films
Films shot in Vancouver
Films about dogs
Films about animals playing sports
Films directed by Robert Vince
Air Bud (series)
2000s English-language films
Films about animals
2000s American films